Senator Rusch may refer to:

Arthur Rusch (born 1946), South Dakota State Senate
Nicholas J. Rusch (1822–1864), Iowa State Senate
Walter J. Rush (1871–1961), Wisconsin State Senate